League tables for teams participating in Nelonen, the fifth tier in the Finnish Soccer League system, in 2011.

League Tables 2011

Helsinki

Section 1

Section 2

Play-Offs
 Ponnistus (Lohko 1/I)   MPS/Atletico Malmi (Lohko 2/I)   4-1 (2-0)
 Vesa (Lohko 1/II)   MaKu/Baltika (Lohko 2/II)            1-4 (0-2)

Uusimaa

Section 1

Section 2

South-East Finland (Kaakkois-Suomi)

Eastern Finland (Itä-Suomi)

Section A

Section B

Play-Offs (leading teams)

Play-Offs (middle teams)

Central Finland (Keski-Suomi)

Northern Finland (Pohjois-Suomi)

Oulu

Lapland (Lappi)

Central Ostrobothnia (Keski-Pohjanmaa)

Vaasa

Satakunta

Tampere

Turku and Åland (Turku and Ahvenanmaa)

Footnotes

References and sources
Finnish FA
ResultCode

Nelonen (football) seasons
5
Finland
Finland